Fredy Mascarenhas (born 11 April 1981 in Cuncolim, Goa) is an Indian professional footballer who plays as a striker, for X-Roads Warriors in the Bermudian Premier Division.

Youth and early career
Fredy Mascarenhas was born on 11 April 1981 in Cuncolim, Goa, India. He started his liking of the game football at a young age after seeing his neighbour and good friend Siano Fernandes who played for Dempo. At the age of 13, he joined his local school football team at Our Lady of Health High School in which he also played in the Subroto Mukerjee Cup. At the same time, Mascarenhas played for his village team in the Goan inter-village tournaments at the under-14 and u-16 levels. Seeing his attitude and skill, his coach, Levino Dias, urged him to give football a serious thought as a career.

He then signed up to join the Salgaocar SC under-19 side and at the same time played for lower division Goan clubs like Cuncolim Union and Raitura SC. While at Salgaocar, he was trained under former u-19 coach Derrick Pereira, who is currently the head coach of Pune FC.

After two seasons, Fredy joined first division Goan club St. Anthony's SC Colva, helping them get promoted to the Goa Professional League. While at Salgaocar, Mascarenhas suffered an accident which kept him out of football for a year. He made a comeback the following season and scored in the first match with the first touch against Churchill brothers. He represented Goa for the Santosh trophy where he was the highest scorer and also became the first player from Goa to score a double hat-trick in a single match against Tripura.

He retired from football in July 2009 after winning the Santosh Trophy with Goa for the second time, thus leaving Indian football on a high note. He had missed some opportunities to represent Goa in junior age-level tournaments due to personal reasons.

Career

Salgaocar
After falling to injury while at Colva, Fredy made his return to football by signing for National Football League side Salgaocar where he played for 3 years, after representing their under-19 for 2 years.

Churchill Brothers
Fredy then joined Churchill Brothers S.C. of the National Football League. While with Churchill Fredy scored many goals and even won the Santosh Trophy while with Churchill.

East Bengal
Fredy then left Goa to play in Kolkata with East Bengal FC. His time there was short but while at Bengal he won the Indian Super Cup and Federation Cup.

Sporting Goa
Fredy then made his return to Goa in 2007 by signing for Sporting Clube de Goa. While at Sporting he played in the I-League with the most notable game coming against his former club, Churchill Brothers, on 18 February 2008 with an 80th-minute goal at the Fatorda Stadium ending the game at 1–1 and denying Churchill of the I-League championship for the time being. Fredy retired from football in July 2009 at the age of 28 and moved to Bermuda to take a non-footballing job.

Robin Hood

Three years after retiring from football, Fredy made his return by signing for Robin Hood FC of the Bermudian Premier Division. Fredy then made his debut for Robin Hood two days later on 19 March 2012 against PHC Zebras in which he earned huge praise.

X-Roads Warriors
In 2015, he moved to another Bermudian Premier League side X-Roads Warriors.

International
Fredy was part of the India national football team during their tour to Canada under coach Bob Houghton and was donning Jersey no. 18. He was also part of the Indian team for their World cup 2010 qualifying matches against Saudi Arabia (home and away). He debuted for the national team on 16 August 2006, in a 3–0 loss to Saudi Arabia.

He later attended National camp under Ex-India national team coach Stephen Constantine.

Honours
Salgaocar
 Goa Professional League: 2003, 2004
Goa
 Santosh Trophy: 2008–09

See also

 List of Indian football players in foreign leagues

References

External links

Indian footballers
1981 births
Living people
I-League players
Salgaocar FC players
Churchill Brothers FC Goa players
East Bengal Club players
Sporting Clube de Goa players
Indian expatriate footballers
Association football forwards
Expatriate footballers in Bermuda
Indian expatriate sportspeople in Bermuda
Footballers from Goa